Eluru is a city in Andhra Pradesh, India. Eluru may also refer to

Places
Eluru (rural), a partial outgrowth of Eluru
Eluru (Assembly constituency)
Eluru (Lok Sabha constituency) 
Eluru Road, Vijayawada in Andhra Pradesh

See also
Eluru Urban Development Authority
Eluru railway station
Eluru New bus station in Eluru
Eluru Old bus station 
Eluru Municipal Corporation
Eluru Buddha Park in Eluru
Eluru mandal in Andhra Pradesh
Eluru revenue division